Karl Otto Clemens Wittgenstein (8 April 1847 – 20 January 1913) was a German-born Austrian steel tycoon. A friend of Andrew Carnegie, with whom he was often compared, at the end of the 19th century he controlled an effective monopoly on steel and iron resources within the Austro-Hungarian Empire, and had by the 1890s acquired one of the largest fortunes in the world. He was also the father of concert pianist Paul Wittgenstein, philosopher Ludwig Wittgenstein and of philanthropist Margaret Stonborough-Wittgenstein.

Family background and origins 

The grandfather of Karl Wittgenstein was an estate manager named Moses Meyer, who came from Laasphe in the former Wittgenstein kreis (county). He moved to Korbach before 1802, where he was a merchant.

Around 1808, Moses Meyer named himself Wittgenstein, after his birthplace Siegen-Wittgenstein and thereafter was known as Moses Meyer Wittgenstein.

At first, Wittgenstein's business became the biggest and most successful enterprise in the city of Korbach, but also shortly thereafter began to decline.  He had a son, Hermann Christian (born 12 September 1802 in Korbach; died 1878 in Vienna) who moved the business to Gohlis at the end of the 1830s. From there, the family continued to prosper financially. In 1938, to escape Nazi racial laws and to be reclassified as half Jewish, his descendants claimed that Herman Christian was not the son of Moses Meyer Wittgenstein but rather the illegitimate offspring of a prince of the House of Waldeck.

After Hermann Christian converted to Protestantism, he married Fanny Figdor in 1839. She came from one of the most important business families in Vienna, and like Hermann was Jewish by birth.

Karl, born in 1847, was the sixth of eleven children of Hermann and Fanny.  Three years later the family moved to Vösendorf (Mödling district) in Austria, where his four younger siblings were born. One of his brothers, Paul Wittgenstein (1842–1928), was the father of Dr Karl Paul Wittgenstein who married Hilde Köchert, daughter of renowned Viennese jeweller Heinrich Köchert: their son Paul Wittgenstein (1907–1979) was "Wittgenstein's Nephew", the central character of a book by his friend Thomas Bernhard.

Biography

Early life and career 
Karl had resisted in his youth the classical teaching methods which were imposed upon the children of Viennese bourgeoisie. Karl ran away from home at the age of eleven and at the age of seventeen had been expelled from school for an essay he wrote in which he denied the "immortality of the soul". His father, Hermann, continued in his desire to educate his son by hiring private tutors to ensure Karl passed his exams but Karl, again, ran away, staying in Vienna for a couple of months before fleeing to New York with little money and his violin. Monk writes, "He managed nevertheless to maintain himself for over two years by working as a waiter, a saloon musician, a bartender and a teacher (of the violin, the horn, mathematics, German and anything else he could think of)." He returned to Vienna in 1867 and pursued his interest in engineering. After a year of education and an apprenticeship, Karl took the job of a draughtsman on the construction of a rolling mill in Bohemia, a post offered to him by Paul Kupelwieser, the brother of his brother-in-law. Karl rapidly rose through the company eventually taking over Kupelweiser as Managing Director within the space of five years. By the end of the nineteenth century, Karl Wittgenstein had become one of the wealthiest men in Europe and a leading figure in the iron and steel industry. In 1898, he retired from his posts and transferred much of his wealth to foreign equities, principally in the United States which protected the Wittgenstein family from the inflation in Vienna after the first world war.

Children 
Karl married Leopoldine Maria Josefa Kalmus, known among friends as Poldi, in 1873. She was the only spouse of any of Hermann Christian's children who had a Jewish background; her father was a Bohemian Jew and her mother was Austrian-Slovene Catholic. They had the following children:
 Hermine "Mining" (b. 1 December 1874 in Teplitz; d. 11 February 1950 in Vienna) unmarried
 Dora (b. 1876 in Vienna; died at birth)
 Johannes "Hans" (b. 1877 in Vienna; d. 1902 in Chesapeake Bay, probable suicide), a musical prodigy
 Konrad "Kurt" (b. 1 May 1878 in Vienna; d. October/November 1918, suicide)
 Helene "Lenka" (b. 23 August 1879 in Vienna; d. April 1956 in Vienna) married to Dr. Max Salzer
 Rudolf "Rudi" (b. 27 June 1881 in Vienna; d. 2 May 1904 in Berlin, suicide)
 Margaret "Gretl" (b. 19 September 1882 in Vienna; d. 27 September 1958 in Vienna) married to Jerome Stonborough in 1904, divorced in 1923
 Paul (b. 11 May 1887 in Vienna; d. 3 March 1961 in New York), concert pianist
 Ludwig "Lucki" (b. 26 April 1889 in Vienna; d. 29 April 1951 in Cambridge), philosopher

References

External links 
 Karl Wittgenstein, Business Tycoon and Art Patron
 Ludwig Wittgenstein: häusliches Milieu
 Leipzig-Gohlis - Karl Wittgenstein
 Wittgenstein Archiv, Cambridge

1847 births
1913 deaths
Businesspeople from Leipzig
German Protestants
Austrian businesspeople
Karl
People from the Kingdom of Saxony
People from Meidling
Austrian people of Jewish descent
Converts to Protestantism from Judaism